Frank Sedgman defeated Gardnar Mulloy 6–1, 6–2, 6–3 in the final to win the men's singles tennis title at the 1952 U.S. National Championships.

Seeds
The tournament used two lists of eight players for seeding the men's singles event; one for U.S. players and one for foreign players. Frank Sedgman is the champion; others show the round in which they were eliminated.

U.S.

  Vic Seixas (fourth round)
  Dick Savitt (quarterfinals)
  Arthur Larsen (fourth round)
  Herbie Flam (fourth round)
  Bill Talbert (fourth round)
  Gardnar Mulloy (finalist)
  Ham Richardson (semifinals)
  Tut Bartzen (fourth round)

Foreign
  Frank Sedgman (champion)
  Ken McGregor (first round)
  Mervyn Rose (semifinals)
  Philippe Washer (fourth round)
  Kurt Nielsen (third round)
  Felicisimo Ampon (fourth round)
  Ken Rosewall (quarterfinals)
  Lew Hoad (quarterfinals)

Draw

Key
 Q = Qualifier
 WC = Wild card
 LL = Lucky loser
 r = Retired

Final eight

Earlier rounds

Section 1

Section 2

Section 3

Section 4

Section 5

Section 6

Section 7

Section 8

References

External links
 1952 U.S. National Championships on ITFtennis.com, the source for this draw

Men's Singles
U.S. National Championships (tennis) by year – Men's singles